Game of Silence is an American crime drama television series based on the Turkish series Suskunlar (English original title: Game of Silence) which is based on the true story of children who were sentenced in absentia to nine years in prison on the charge of stealing a baklava car in Gaziantep in 1997.

Timur Savcı, who was in the original series, is a producer of Game of Silence. Other producers are  David Hudgins, Carol Mendelsohn, Julie Weitz, Niels Arden Oplev, and Tariq Jalil. The series premiered as a "preview" on April 12, 2016. It then debuted in its regular Thursday at 10:00 PM timeslot on April 14, 2016, and aired until June 5, 2016. On May 13, 2016, NBC cancelled the series after one season.

Cast
 David Lyons as Jackson Brooks
 Curran Walters as Young Jackson
 Michael Raymond-James as Gil Harris
 Judah Lewis as Young Gil Harris
 Larenz Tate as Shawn Cook
 McCarrie McCausland as Young Shawn
 Bre Blair as Jessie West
 Katie Kelly as Young Jessie
 Conor O'Farrell as Warden Roy Carroll
 Deidrie Henry as Detective Liz Winters
 Demetrius Grosse as Terry Bosch
 Myles Grier as Young Terry
 Claire van der Boom as Marina Nagle
 Derek Phillips as Gary "Boots" Nolan
 Cannon Kluytman as Young Boots

Episodes

Reception

On Metacritic, the series holds an average score of 58 (out of 100 points) based on 21 critics, indicating "mixed or average reviews". Review aggregator website Rotten Tomatoes reported that 11 of 19 critical responses were negative, averaging a 42% rating. The site's consensus reads: "Competent acting and a sufficiently intriguing premise aren't enough to make up for Game of Silence unnecessarily convoluted, heavily clichéd storytelling."

References

External links
 
 

2016 American television series debuts
2016 American television series endings
2010s American crime drama television series
English-language television shows
NBC original programming
Television series by Sony Pictures Television
Television series by Universal Television
American thriller television series
American television series based on non-American television series
Non-Turkish television series based on Turkish television series